Canglang Subdistrict is a subdistrict of Gusu District, Suzhou, Jiangsu, China.

History 
On March 24, 2017, the subdistrict of Xujiang Subdistrict was merged into Canglang Subdistrict.

Administrative divisions 
As of 2020, the subdistrict administers 21 residential communities.

 Guihua Community
 Yulan Community
 Yangcanli First Community
 Yangcanli Second Community
 Zhuhui Community
 Ruiguang Community
 East Avenue Community
 West Avenue Community
 Jia'an Community
 Jiqing Community
 Jinshi Community
 Daoqian Community
 Ximei Community
 Wannian Community
 Sanxiang Community
 Tongjing First Community
 Tongjing Second Community
 Xincang Community
 Xuhong Community
 Xujiang Community
 Tainan Community

See also
List of township-level divisions of Suzhou
Xujiang Subdistrict

References

Township-level divisions of Suzhou
Gusu District